Travis Smith is an American politician currently serving in the Missouri House of Representatives from Missouri's 155th district. He won the seat after defeating Democrat Mike Lind 84.8% to 15.2%. He was sworn in on January 6, 2021.

References

Republican Party members of the Missouri House of Representatives
21st-century American politicians
Living people
Year of birth missing (living people)